The Philippines competed in the 2017 Asian Winter Games in Sapporo and Obihiro, Japan from February 19 to 26. The team consisted of 29 athletes in three sports (four disciplines) and nine officials, which represented the largest Filipino delegation at the Asian Winter Games compared to the delegations sent in previous editions the Philippines participated in.

On February 19, 2017 it was announced that ice hockey player Carlo Garrucho would be the country's flagbearer during the parade of nations at the opening ceremony.

Competitors
The following table lists the Filipino delegation per sport and gender.

Figure skating

Four figure skaters were named to the Filipino team, including 2014 Winter Olympics competitor Michael Christian Martinez.

Singles

Ice hockey

The Philippines entered an ice hockey team for the first time. The team will play in division two of the competition. The team consists of 23 athletes. The Philippines finished in third place (13th place overall) in division 2 of the competition.

Men's tournament

The Philippines was represented by the following athletes:

Gianpietro Iseppi (G)
Paolo Spafford (G)
Javier Alfonso (D)
Carlo Garrucho (D)
Alison Lapiz (D)
Gino Orda (D)
Jed Reyes (D)
Paul Sanchez (D)
Julius Santiago (D)
Miguel Serrano (D)
Jose Cadiz (F)
Philip Cheng (F)
Steven Füglister (C) (F)
Francois Gautlier (A) (F)
Benjamin Imperial (F)
Lenard Rigel Lancero II (F)
Carl Montano (F)
Hector Navasero (F)
Miguel Relampagos (F)  
Jon Samson (F)
Julian Santiago (F)
Patrick Syquiatco (F)
Michael Wang (F)

Legend: G = Goalie, D = Defense-man, F = Forward, C = Captain, A = Assistant captain
Group A

13th place match

Short track speed skating

The Philippines has entered one female competitor, marking the Asian Winter Games debut of the country in the sport.

Snowboarding

The Philippines has entered one male competitor, marking the Asian Winter Games debut of the country in the sport.

References

Nations at the 2017 Asian Winter Games
Asian Winter Games
Philippines at the Asian Winter Games